The Hangaza are a Bantu ethnolinguistic group based in Ngara District of Kagera Region in northwestern Tanzania. The Hangaza population is estimated to number 450,000.

References

Ethnic groups in Tanzania
Indigenous peoples of East Africa